Margarita Ramos Villar (born 26 June 1966 in Cea) is a retired Spanish athlete who specialised in the shot put. She represented her country at the 1992 Summer Olympics as well as one indoor and one outdoor World Championships.

Her personal bests in the event are 17.93 metres outdoors (Alcalá de Henares 1997) and 17.74 metres indoors (Espinho 1998).

Competition record

References

RFEA profile

1966 births
Living people
Sportspeople from the Province of León
Spanish female shot putters
Olympic athletes of Spain
Athletes (track and field) at the 1992 Summer Olympics
World Athletics Championships athletes for Spain
Mediterranean Games gold medalists for Spain
Mediterranean Games bronze medalists for Spain
Mediterranean Games medalists in athletics
Athletes (track and field) at the 1987 Mediterranean Games
Athletes (track and field) at the 1991 Mediterranean Games
Athletes (track and field) at the 1993 Mediterranean Games
Athletes (track and field) at the 1997 Mediterranean Games